Françoise Lépine is a French actress.

Theatre

Filmography

References

External links
 
 

French film actresses
Living people
20th-century French actresses
21st-century French actresses
Year of birth missing (living people)
Place of birth missing (living people)